Rumay Wang (born April 18, 1991), better known as Hafu, is an American Twitch streamer and former professional World of Warcraft, Bloodline Champions and Hearthstone player.

Early life
Wang was born in Newton, Massachusetts to Chinese immigrant parents from Beijing. She grew up in Lexington. She was introduced to the MMORPG World of Warcraft in high school by her friends. She later studied at Bentley University but dropped out to focus on gaming.

Career 
Wang started taking the game World of Warcraft more seriously when the player versus player (PvP) arena mode was introduced to the game in 2007. At this point, she did not know it was possible to play video games professionally, but her talent called the attention of sponsors, which allowed her to attend the Major League Gaming (MLG) in 2008, and several other tournaments over the next years. Eventually, Hafu switched to another PvP arena game, Bloodline Champions, becoming the DreamHack Summer 2011 champion, along with teammates MegaZero and Iverson.

More recently, Wang's main focus has been on her career as a live streamer, although she has taken part in some gaming tournaments, most notably for Hearthstone. Several thousand people regularly view her Twitch streams, and she has over 1 million followers on her channel. In late 2015, she appeared on Smasher's Legends of Gaming. On August 15, 2019, Hafu joined G2 Esports as a Teamfight Tactics streamer. Hafu won the second PogChamps chess tournament in September 2020.

She has spoken out against sexual harassment in gaming.

In September 2020, Wang began streaming and posting videos of her playing Among Us, frequently playing with other popular streamers including Disguised Toast, dakotaz, and xChocoBars. The increasing popularity of the game in part allowed her to become the second most-viewed female streamer in the month of November, only being surpassed by Valkyrae.

Personal life 
Wang married fellow Twitch streamer David "Dogdog" Caero, on April 13, 2021.

References

External links 
 Twitch channel

1991 births
American esports players
American sportspeople of Chinese descent
Hearthstone players
Living people
Sportspeople from Newton, Massachusetts
Twitch (service) streamers
Women esports players
World of Warcraft players